The Church of St Bartholomew is a church on Brinklow Road in Binley, in the City of Coventry in the West Midlands of England. The building is grade I listed, though churches in ecclesiastical use are exempt from listed building procedures. The church was built between 1771 and 1773 for the Earl of Craven of nearby Coombe Abbey.

References 

Churches in Coventry
Grade I listed churches in the West Midlands (county)
Churches completed in 1771
Binley